This is a compendium of continuous integration software that supports a software engineering practice, continuous integration, in which developers' changes are immediately tested and reported when they are added to the mainline code base. The comparison of various continuous integration tools is done on the basis of platform, license, builders and Integration IDEs.

Features

SCM system support 
The following table compares the features of some of the most popular Continuous Integration software on the basis of the Source Control Management or the Version Control Management which is an essential part of CI Software system. The table shows some popular SCMs and whether they are supported by the CI software.

References

Further reading 
 

Continuous integration
Continuous integration software